Mount Bigelow may refer to:

 Mount Bigelow (Arizona), in the Santa Catalina Mountains, United States
 Mount Bigelow (Maine), in the Appalachian Mountains, United States

See also
 Bigelow Peak, in California
 Bigelow Mountain Preserve, in Maine
 Bigelow (disambiguation)